Jamal Uddin Ahmad (c. 1929 – 3 January 2015) was a Bangladeshi politician and accountant. He served as the Deputy Prime Minister of Bangladesh from 1977 until 1982. He also served as the former President of the South Asian Federation of Accountants, as well as the President of the Institute of Chartered Accountants of Bangladesh for two terms.

In 1954, Ahmad received a master's degree in commerce from the University of Dhaka.

Ahmad died at his home in the Baridhara neighborhood in Dhaka at approximately 10p.m. on 3 January 2015, at the age of 85. His first funeral prayer was held at the Gulshan Azad Mosque in Gulshan Thana with burial at a family cemetery in Daulatpur union, Fatikchhari Upazila, Chittagong District.

References

2015 deaths
Deputy Prime Ministers of Bangladesh
Bangladeshi accountants
University of Dhaka alumni
People from Dhaka
People from Fatikchhari Upazila
Year of birth uncertain
20th-century Bengalis
21st-century Bengalis